Susan Rosenbloom (February 26, 1958 – May 31, 2015) was a choreographer, artistic director, teacher, and poet from the UK.

References

1958 births
2015 deaths
British choreographers